Liberia entered the 1980 Summer Olympics in Moscow, USSR but withdrew after the Opening Ceremony.  The nation returned to the Olympic Games after missing the 1976 Summer Olympics.

See also
People's Redemption Council, overthrew the government of Liberia in a coup three months before the Olympics

References
Official Olympic Reports

Nations at the 1980 Summer Olympics
1980
Oly